Euzophera bigella, the quince moth, is a species of snout moth in the genus Euzophera. It was described by Zeller in 1848. It is found in most of Europe (except Ireland, the Netherlands, Fennoscandia and the Baltic region), Iran, Baluchistan and Morocco.

The wingspan is 15–20 mm.

The larvae have been recorded feeding on the wood of quince, apple, pear, plum, apricot and cherry and the fruits of quince, apple, pear, walnut and pomegranate.

References

Moths described in 1848
Phycitini
Moths of Europe
Moths of Asia